Lucicutiidae is a family of copepods belonging to the order Calanoida.

Genera:
 Lucicutia Giesbrecht, 1898

References

Copepods